The River Gwash, occasionally Guash, a tributary of the River Welland, flows through the English counties of Leicestershire, Rutland and Lincolnshire. It rises just outside the village of Knossington in Leicestershire, near the western edge of Rutland.

Course

The Gwash then helps to fill the Rutland Water reservoir which was formed by damming its valley at Empingham. From the reservoir a controlled flow is released to maintain the flow around Tolethorpe Hall, Ryhall and Stamford and into the River Welland.

East of Stamford, its course is now fixed, but it lies in a small flood plain which shows clear signs of the river's former meandering. The pasture fields include depressions that fill during wet seasons, forming oxbow lakes, though they are not of the classical shape. Near Stamford it is the parish boundary between Stamford and Uffington.

West of Stamford, the Gwash crossed the Stamford Canal, requiring some elaborate hydraulic works. Although the canal has been dry for over a century, the Borderville weir has only just been removed, and some meanders re-watered.

The river feeds the millpond at Newstead Mill in the parish of Uffington before entering the Welland at Newstead Bridge just east of Stamford. The confluence was restored in 2021 by the Welland Rivers Trust.

Wildlife
The river supports a wild variety of fish species, including grayling and trout. Chub and dace inhabit the lower length below Newstead bridge in Stamford.

There are attempts to re-introduce water voles in the area.

There are concerns about non-native signal crayfish becoming dominant in the river, and reports of a deliberate introduction. The river has formed part of pilot trials of means to control that population.

Etymology

The name appears to be derived from the Old English  'a washing, a flood'. The earliest form was "le Whasse" ( 1230); the use of an initial G- is first recorded in 1586, and the spelling 'Gwash' appears to be a quasi-Welsh spelling.

In literature
Local poet John Clare wrote a sonnet about the Gwash, published in Poems Descriptive of Rural Life and Scenery (London, 1820):

Where winding gash wirls round its wildest scene
On this romantic bend I sit me down
On that side view the meads their smoothing green
Edg'd with the peeping hamlets checkering brown
Here the steep hill as dripping headlong down
While glides the stream a silver streak between
As glides the shaded clouds along the sky
Brightning & deep'ning loosing as they're seen
In light & shade—so when old willows lean
Thus their broad shadow—runs the river bye
With tree & bush repleat a wilderd scene
& mossd & Ivyd sparkling on my eye—
O thus wild musing am I doubly blest
My woes unheeding—& my heart at rest.

References

Bibliography

External links

 Guash Fishing Club
 Heritage of Rutland Water
 Map of Welland Rivers, including the Gwash

Rivers of Leicestershire
Rivers of Rutland
Rivers of Lincolnshire
South Kesteven District